Andrew Barron (born 24 December 1980 in Invercargill) is a retired New Zealand association football player. Barron, naturally a central midfielder, combines full-time employment as an investment counselor and banker with semi-professional football.

He last played for Kiwi FC in Samoa and was also an All White who played at the 2010 FIFA World Cup, making him one of the very few amateur All Whites in recent years.

Club career
Barron signed for Canterbury United, a New Zealand Football Championship franchise at the start of the 2005–06 season. After impressing making 15 appearances and scoring one goal, he was scouted by other NZFC club Team Wellington for the following season and scored four goals in 12 appearances in a playmaker role.

In 2008, Barron went in search of a professional career overseas and signed with the Minnesota Thunder team of the USL First Division, however after struggling to make an impact, he returned to New Zealand to play for Team Wellington midway through the NZFC 2008–09 season. Barron has made 34 appearances (all starts) and scored 12 goals in both stints with the Wellington club.

International career
Barron made his debut for the New Zealand national football team in the first match of a two-game friendly series against Malaysia on 19 February 2006. Barron scored his first international goal in the second match of the Malaysian series with an 88th-minute strike to seal a 2–1 win for the All Whites.

Barron was included in the New Zealand squad for the 2009 FIFA Confederations Cup in South Africa, along with fellow non-professionals James Bannatyne and Aaron Scott and was also part of the All Whites team which beat Bahrain in the 2010 FIFA World Cup qualification play-off match. During the 2010 FIFA World Cup, he made headlines when he featured as a late substitute against defending champions Italy and became the first non-professional footballer to participate in the tournament.

Career statistics

See also
 New Zealand national football team
 New Zealand at the FIFA World Cup
 New Zealand national football team results
 List of New Zealand international footballers

References

External links
 Team Wellington Player Profile
 New Zealand Football Profile
 

1980 births
Living people
Sportspeople from Invercargill
Association football midfielders
New Zealand association footballers
New Zealand international footballers
New Zealand expatriate association footballers
Lisburn Distillery F.C. players
NIFL Premiership players
New Orleans Shell Shockers players
Minnesota Thunder players
Team Wellington players
USL First Division players
USL League Two players
Expatriate association footballers in Northern Ireland
Expatriate soccer players in the United States
New Zealand expatriate sportspeople in Northern Ireland
New Zealand expatriate sportspeople in the United States
2008 OFC Nations Cup players
2009 FIFA Confederations Cup players
2010 FIFA World Cup players